The 1902 Northern Illinois State Normal football team represented Northern Illinois State Normal College as an independent in the 1902 college football season. They were led by fourth-year head coach John A. H. Keith. The team finished the season with a 5–1–1 record. Sanford Givens was the team's captain.

Schedule

References

Northern Illinois State
Northern Illinois Huskies football seasons
Northern Illinois State Normal football